Forum is a two-hour live call-in radio program produced by KQED-FM, presenting discussions of local, state, national and international issues, and in-depth interviews. The program began in 1990 as a politics-oriented talk show, created and hosted by Kevin Pursglove. From 1993 to 2021, it was hosted by scholar, author, professor, and former KGO Radio host Michael Krasny, who broadened the program's scope to a cross-section of current events. After hosting the show for nearly 30 years, Krasny announced his retirement effective February 2021. A number of guests hosted the show in the months following, before Alexis Madrigal was selected as the new co-host along with Mina Kim, who had already held that post since July 2020. 

The format of Forum varies from show to show, but generally involves an in-person interview followed by public Q&A via phone or email with one or more subjects, often nationally prominent authors and scholars. The program airs for two hours on weekday mornings, with an hour repeated in the evening.

References

External links
 Forum official webpage
 Michael Krasny biography at KQED-FM

American public radio programs
American talk radio programs
KQED Inc.
1990 radio programme debuts